The rabbitsfoot (Theliderma cylindrica) is a species of freshwater mussel. It is an aquatic bivalve mollusk, in the family Unionidae, the river mussels.

This species is native to the United States, where it is widespread in the drainages of the Ohio River and the Great Lakes. It has disappeared from over half its historic range.

Subspecies 

Two subspecies have been described. It is unclear whether they represent distinct evolutionary lineages, or are merely ecophenotypic variation which would not warrant any taxonomic status. A 2007 genetic study has cast doubt upon the validity of the existence of two subspecies.
 Theliderma cylindrica cylindrica (Say, 1817) — 
 Theliderma cylindrica strigillata (Wright, 1898) — Rough rabbitsfoot, found only in the headwaters of the Tennessee River.

See also
List of non-marine molluscs of the United States

References

Endemic fauna of the United States
cylindrica
Bivalves described in 1817